Cotswolds Brewing Co. is a microbrewery in Cheltenham, England in the United Kingdom.  Aside from beer, they also produce vodka and gin.

History
Cotswolds Brewing Co. was founded in 2005 by Emma and Rick Keene. The couple started the brewery to focus on lager versus ale beer. The first beer they released was a German-style lager called Cotswold Premium. It has been named of the "10 of the Best Breweries in the Cotswolds" by The Cotswolds Gentleman.

Brewery

The brewery is located on a farm in the Bourton-on-the-Water area in The Cotswolds. They offer two hour tours during the summer, which includes a tasting of the beers they produce. The brewery building is made of Cotswold stone.

Production

Liquor
Cotswolds Brewing Co. produces gin, which is a favorite alcoholic drink of Emma Keene. Due to legal reasons, they distill their gin at Thames Distillers Ltd. in London. The gin is made with hawthorn berries, verbena, and lime.

References

External links

"Lager is having a Renaissance thanks to a new generation of talented craft brewers" from The Independent

Cotswolds
Breweries in England
2005 establishments in England
Companies based in Cheltenham